Ambulyx moorei, the cinnamon gliding hawkmoth, is a moth of the family Sphingidae. The species was first described by Frederic Moore in 1858. It is found in Sri Lanka, southern and eastern India, the Nicobar Islands and Andaman Islands, Thailand, Vietnam, southern China, the Philippines (Palawan, Balabac), Malaysia (Peninsular, Sarawak), Singapore and Indonesia (Sumatra, Java, Kalimantan).

Description 
The wingspan is 100–110 mm. The color varies from yellowish brown through orange brown to dark purplish red brown. The caterpillar has an aqueous bluish-green head with a narrow, double yellowish dorsal stripe running vertex to apex of clypeus and from vertex to nape. Body is grass green on dorsum with yellow dots, except those of the dorso-lateral line on segments 3 to 5, which are white. There is no color changing before pupation, only becoming duller in shade. Pupa is 46–50 mm long with dark chestnut color up to segments 8 to 10, and then color becomes much paler. Spiracles are black with central slit chestnut cremaster nearly black.

Biology 
Larvae have been recorded on Canarium album in China. Other recorded food plants include Buchanania and Lannea species. These moths are very sluggish during the day but fly well at night.

References

External links
"Ambulyx moorei Moore, [1858] -- Cinnamon gliding hawkmoth". Sphingidae of the Eastern Palaearctic. Retrieved January 11, 2019.

Ambulyx
Moths described in 1858
Moths of Asia